"Slide" is a song by Scottish pop band The Big Dish, which was released in 1986 as the second single from their debut studio album Swimmer. The song was written by Steven Lindsay and produced by Ian Ritchie.

With its original 1986 release, "Slide" failed to reach the top 100 of the UK Singles Chart, stalling at number 147. A reissue saw the single peak at number 86 in the UK Singles Chart in May 1987.

Music video
The song's music video was directed by Larry Williams and produced by Leslie Libman and Francine Moore. It achieved light rotation on MTV.

Critical reception
On its release as a single, Jerry Smith of Music Week described "Slide" as "another well written number, but although polished and worthy of attention, does lack the pop dynamics of their two previous, brilliant, singles". He described the Big Dish as "promising" and "certainly a band to watch for in the future". Paul Benbow of the Reading Evening Post considered the song to be "big production pop just right for Radio 1". Paul Massey of the Aberdeen Evening Express stated, "One of the UK's most underrated bands come up with another song that reaches out and demands attention: rather mournful but deserving of success."

As the band's US debut single, Billboard wrote, "Highly touted Scottish band offers a graceful reworking of the "Everybody Wants to Rule the World" groove, with attractive baritone vocal, tidy arrangement, and soaring chorus." Cash Box considered "Slide" to be an "emotionally rendered pop song with jazzy overtones" and a "promising debut". In a review of Swimmer, Brant Houston of the Hartford Courant described "Slide" as a track that "provides [a] big, open sound for a summer's day of lounging on the lawn".

Track listing
7" single
"Slide" – 3:58
"Reverend Killer" – 3:59

7" single (US promo)
"Slide" (Edit) – 3:58
"Slide" (Edit) – 3:58

12" single
"Slide" (Extended Version) – 5:58
"Reverend Killer" – 3:59
"Presence" – 3:38

12" single (US promo)
"Slide" (LP Version) – 5:06
"Slide" (Edit) – 3:58

Personnel
The Big Dish
 Steven Lindsay – vocals, guitar, keyboards
 Brian McFie – lead guitar, second guitar
 Raymond Docherty – bass

Production
 Ian Ritchie – producer and programming on "Slide"
 Chris Sheldon – engineer on "Slide" and "Reverend Killer"
 Paul Hardiman – producer on "Reverend Killer"
 Glyn Johns – producer on "Presence"

Other
 Gary Wathen – art direction
 Red Ranch – design
 Heather Angel – photography

Charts

References

1986 songs
1986 singles
Virgin Records singles